The province of Cagayan has 820 barangays comprising its 28 municipalities and 1 city.

Barangays

References

.
Cagayan